Radosław Majewski (born 15 December 1986) is a Polish professional footballer who plays for Wieczysta Kraków. He also played for the Poland national team.

Club career

Early career
Majewski was born in Pruszków, Masovian Voivodeship. He began his career at his hometown club Znicz Pruszków. In 2007, he was signed by Dyskobolia Grodzisk Wielkopolski following an impressive performance against the then-Ekstraklasa club. In 2008, he moved to the Polish capital due to Dyskobolia's Polonia Warsaw. However, after some lackluster performances and criticism of his off-pitch lifestyle, the club decided to loan him to Nottingham Forest with the hope that the move would mature him and help him rediscover the form that got him into the Polish international set up in the years prior.

Nottingham Forest
Majewski joined Championship club Nottingham Forest on a season-long loan on 23 July 2009. Forest paid a fee of £130,000 for his services and agreed a fee of roughly £1 million if they wished to sign him on a permanent transfer at any point during the loan. He impressed immediately in red and white, scoring a 30-yard drive in the first minute for Forest against arch-rivals Derby in August. His tenacity, intelligence and eye for a killer pass had not gone un-noticed by the Forest management, and in March it was revealed that they were looking to make the deal permanent. On 25 August, Majewski scored his first goal for Forest, giving Nottingham Forest victory in extra time of a League Cup match against Middlesbrough. His first league goal came in the first minute of the match against bitter East Midlands rivals Derby County, where he smashed an 'unstoppable' shot in from the edge of the area, on 29 August 2009, with Forest winning 3–2. On 8 January 2010, Majewski scored his fourth goal of the season in a stunning 3–1 away win at West Bromwich Albion to send Forest into second in the Championship.

Majewski's permanent move to Nottingham Forest was confirmed on 5 May 2010. In the 2010–11 season, Majewski made 28 appearances, limited by the good form of Lewis McGugan keeping him out of the team. Majewski scored two league goals, one against Swansea City and one against Coventry City. In the 2011–12 season, Majewski scored six league goals. The first was in a 3–2 away defeat to Southampton, and the second was a half-volley that proved to be the winner against Blackpool, in a performance that saw him and team-mate Wes Morgan feature in Sky Sports' Football League Team of the Week. On 31 March 2012, in an away league match against Crystal Palace, Majewski scored a hat-trick, in a performance that saw him named in Sky Sports Football League Team of the Week. He followed that up with a late consolation goal in a 2–1 away defeat to Hull City.

Majewski did not score in the 2012–13 season until, much like the previous season, he scored a hat-trick against Huddersfield Town a game which Forest won 6–1. He continued to flourish under the reappointed of Billy Davies with goals coming away from home at Sheffield Wednesday and Charlton Athletic. His form helped him earn a place in Poland national team World Cup qualifiers against Ukraine and San Marino.

Huddersfield Town (loan)
On 29 July 2014, Majewski joined fellow Championship club Huddersfield Town on a season-long loan, wearing the number 45 shirt. He made his début for the Terriers in the 4–0 defeat by AFC Bournemouth on 9 August.

Veria
After being released on a free transfer from Nottingham Forest, Majewski was approached by the Superleague Greece club Veria, which at the same time were ready to sign to their squad the Algerian winger and former teammate of Majewski, Djamel Abdoun. Veria's interest was expressed firstly on 7 August 2015. Five days later, on 7 August 2015, Majewski signed a two-year contract with the Greek club. Majewski debuted for Veria on 23 August 2015 against PAS Giannina.

Majewski scored his first goal for Veria during a Greek Cup match against Atromitos with a powerful shot outside the six-yard box.

Lech Poznań
Majewski joined Lech Poznań in 2016, signing a contract stated to expire on 30 June 2019.

Pogon Szczecin

Majewski signed for Pogon Szczecin in 2018. However, he suffered an injury during his time there.

Western Sydney Wanderers
Majewski signed for A-League club Western Sydney Wanderers on 14 June 2019 on a one-year contract. After making 3 appearances in the FFA Cup including scoring a goal and providing two assists in a 7–1 win over Sydney United, he suffered an Anterior cruciate ligament and Medial collateral ligament injury in his right knee during training following a collision with Dylan McGowan. He returned to Poland for treatment, then returned to Australia only for the COVID-19 pandemic to shut down the A-League. Majewski later spoke of the incident in an interview with the Polish media that called McGowan a "moron" and suggested it was a malicious tackle, a claim McGowan denied.

Wieczysta Kraków
After failing to feature in an A-League match for Western Sydney Wanderers, Majewski signed for sixth tier Polish club, Wieczysta Kraków.

International career
Majewski made his international debut for Poland on his 21st birthday: 15 December 2007. This was the first of his nine caps.

Career statistics

Honours
Dyskobolia Grodzisk
Polish Cup: 2006–07
Ekstraklasa Cup: 2006–07, 2007–08

Lech Poznań
Polish SuperCup: 2016

References

External links

 National team stats
 

1986 births
Living people
People from Pruszków
Sportspeople from Masovian Voivodeship
Polish footballers
Poland under-21 international footballers
Poland international footballers
Association football midfielders
Znicz Pruszków players
Dyskobolia Grodzisk Wielkopolski players
Polonia Warsaw players
Nottingham Forest F.C. players
Huddersfield Town A.F.C. players
Veria F.C. players
Pogoń Szczecin players
Western Sydney Wanderers FC players
Wieczysta Kraków players
Ekstraklasa players
English Football League players
Super League Greece players
Polish expatriate footballers
Expatriate soccer players in Australia
Expatriate footballers in England
Expatriate footballers in Greece
Polish expatriate sportspeople in Australia
Polish expatriate sportspeople in England
Polish expatriate sportspeople in Greece